Royce Simms (born 18 April 1978) is an Australian former professional rugby league footballer who played for Canterbury Bankstown in the National Rugby League.

Simms came to Canterbury from Logan City in Queensland.

A hooker, Simms made two first-grade appearances in the 2001 NRL season. Simms debuted in the Canterbury round 14 win over the Melbourne Storm and played again the following round in a loss to Canberra.

References

External links
Royce Simms at Rugby League project

1978 births
Living people
Australian rugby league players
Rugby league players from Queensland
Rugby league hookers
Canterbury-Bankstown Bulldogs players